Curtis Brown (born September 14, 1945) is an American former professional baseball player. Although his professional career lasted for 16 seasons (1965–1978 and 1980–1981, including Mexican League service), he played only one game of Major League Baseball as the starting left fielder for the Montreal Expos on May 27, 1973.  Facing the San Francisco Giants' Ron Bryant at Candlestick Park, Brown went hitless in four at bats and played errorless ball in the field, recording two putouts, as the Giants won, 6–3. Brown then spent the rest of the season, and his career, in minor league baseball at the Triple-A level.

Signed as an amateur free agent by the New York Mets in 1965, he spent seven seasons in the Mets' farm system before being traded to Montreal in December 1971. His brother, Leon Brown, was also a Major League outfielder, appearing in 64 games played for the 1976 Mets.

References

External links

1945 births
Living people
American expatriate baseball players in Canada
Baseball players from Sacramento, California
Caracas Metropolitanos players
Durham Bulls players
Greenville Mets players
Major League Baseball left fielders
Marion Mets players
Memphis Blues players
Montreal Expos players
Peninsula Whips players
Tidewater Tides players
Williamsport Mets players